Epaminonda Nicu (born 17 December 1979) is a Romanian football player who plays for Liga IV side Progresul 2005 București.

Titles

External links
 
 
 

1979 births
Living people
Romanian footballers
Association football defenders
Liga I players
Liga II players
FC Unirea Urziceni players
ASA 2013 Târgu Mureș players